Lauren Katherine Hewitt (born 25 November 1978 in Warracknabeal, Victoria) is a track and field sprinter from Australia. She competed in three consecutive Summer Olympics, starting in 1996, and won the bronze medal in the women's 200 metres at the 1998 Commonwealth Games.

References
 ABC Profile
 
 

1978 births
Living people
Australian female sprinters
Athletes (track and field) at the 1996 Summer Olympics
Athletes (track and field) at the 2000 Summer Olympics
Athletes (track and field) at the 2004 Summer Olympics
Athletes (track and field) at the 1998 Commonwealth Games
Athletes (track and field) at the 2002 Commonwealth Games
Athletes (track and field) at the 2006 Commonwealth Games
Commonwealth Games gold medallists for Australia
Commonwealth Games bronze medallists for Australia
Olympic athletes of Australia
People from Warracknabeal
Commonwealth Games medallists in athletics
Olympic female sprinters
20th-century Australian women
21st-century Australian women
People educated at St Catherine's School, Melbourne
Sportswomen from Victoria (Australia)
Medallists at the 1998 Commonwealth Games
Medallists at the 2002 Commonwealth Games
Medallists at the 2006 Commonwealth Games